"All Time Low" is a song by American singer Jon Bellion. It was released to digital retailers on May 13, 2016, through Visionary Music Group and Capitol Records, and later to Top 40 radio on August 30, 2016, as the lead single from his debut studio album, The Human Condition (2016). Bellion co-produced and co-wrote the song along with Mark Williams, Raul Cubina, and Travis Mendes. Bellion also performed an acoustic version of the song on his YouTube channel.

Background
In an interview with Idolator's Mike Wass, Bellion said "[All Time Low] is an illustration of what it feels like to be three days into a break up — the really heavy, emotional, 'I don’t even know if I want to continue living at this point.' I'm just being majorly honest and letting you know how horrible everything's been since you left. I don't think it's a specific situation but I want it to be broad so everyone can relate to that. I think everybody's been in that situation at least once in their life. Your first love… when that ends that's a devastating thing to feel."

Release
The original "All Time Low" demo was released sometime in 2015. When asked about the release of the song, Bellion stated "I finished the song two years ago and said no matter what song I made after that, that was going to be my single. It was written so fast. I finished the song and wrote it so quickly. I think that's usually a telling for myself. There are numbers and letters in my head, and puzzle pieces. The way they all fit together so quickly and became the finished puzzle, I was like, 'This has to be a sign'. I fought for it, for about two years, for it to be the lead single. Now that it is, it's great to see that it's really working. It seems to be climbing. People are really gravitating toward it. It's a good sign. I'm excited." The official remix featuring a verse by American rapper A$AP Ferg was released on November 2, 2016. Another official remix featuring British rapper Stormzy was released on March 10, 2017, in the United Kingdom.

Music video
The song's accompanying music video was uploaded on August 31, 2016, on Bellion's Vevo account on YouTube. The music video contains concert footage, from his Human Condition Tour.

Charts

Weekly charts

Year-end charts

Certifications

Release history

References

2016 singles
2016 songs
Capitol Records singles
Jon Bellion songs
Songs written by Jon Bellion
Songs about loneliness